Imidafenacin (INN) is a urinary antispasmodic of the anticholinergic class.
Pharmacol:

Synthesis
The sidechain is a versatile precursor also used in the synthesis of: Bezitramide, Piritramide, Diphenoxylate, & others.

The alkylation of Diphenylacetonitrile [86-29-3] (1) with 1,2-dibromoethane (2) gives 4-Bromo-2,2-Diphenylbutyronitrile [39186-58-8] (3). Alkylation with 2-Methylimidazole (4) gives 4-(2-Methyl-1H-imidazol-1-yl)-2,2-diphenylbutanenitrile [214777-43-2] (5).

References 

Muscarinic antagonists
Imidazoles
Carboxamides